In machine learning, instance-based learning (sometimes called memory-based learning) is a family of learning algorithms that, instead of performing explicit generalization, compare new problem instances with instances seen in training, which have been stored in memory. Because computation is postponed until a new instance is observed, these algorithms are sometimes referred to as "lazy."

It is called instance-based because it constructs hypotheses directly from the training instances themselves.
This means that the hypothesis complexity can grow with the data: in the worst case, a hypothesis is a list of n training items and the computational complexity of classifying a single new instance is O(n). One advantage that instance-based learning has over other methods of machine learning is its ability to adapt its model to previously unseen data. Instance-based learners may simply store a new instance or throw an old instance away.

Examples of instance-based learning algorithms are the k-nearest neighbors algorithm, kernel machines and RBF networks. These store (a subset of) their training set; when predicting a value/class for a new instance, they compute distances or similarities between this instance and the training instances to make a decision.

To battle the memory complexity of storing all training instances, as well as the risk of overfitting to noise in the training set, instance reduction algorithms have been proposed.

See also
Analogical modeling

References

Machine learning